The Yamaha TT-R250 is an entry-level,  trail bike that Yamaha produced from 1999 to 2006 to compete with the Honda XR250R.  The TT-R250 was equipped with electric start, and was designed to be reliable and long-lived.

See also 
 Yamaha XT225
 Yamaha TT-R230

References 

TTR250